The 2011 Women's Junior Pan-American Volleyball Cup was the first edition of the annual women's volleyball tournament, played by seven countries from June 14–22, 2011 in Callao, Peru.

Competing Nations

Preliminary round

Group A

Group B

Final round

Championship bracket

Quarterfinals

Semifinals

Fifth place match

Bronze medal match

Final

Final standing

Daniela Uribe,
Grecia Herrada,
Vivian Baella,
Alexandra Muñoz,
Lisset Sosa,
Mabel Olemar,
Rafaella Camet,
Ginna López,
Clarivett Yllescas,
Danae Carranza,
Diana Gonzales,
María de Fátima Acosta (L)

Individual awards

Most Valuable Player

Best Scorer

Best Spiker

Best Blocker

Best Server

Best Digger

Best Setter

Best Receiver

Best Libero

References

External links
 

Women's Pan-American Volleyball Cup
Junior Pan-American Volleyball Cup
V
Volleyball